Extraordinary magisterium may refer to:

 A category of officials in the Roman Republic.  See Magistratus.
 The bishops of the Catholic Church when gathered in an ecumenical council, or the Pope when teaching ex cathedra.  See Infallibility of the Church and Magisterium.

See also 

 Ordinary magisterium (disambiguation)